Leeds Force is an English women's basketball club based in Leeds, West Yorkshire, playing in the Women's British Basketball League. They play their home games at the Carnegie Sports Centre, located on the Headingley Campus of Leeds Metropolitan University in Beckett Park.

The team was established in 2007 as Leeds Carnegie in partnership with Leeds Metropolitan University, as an offshoot from the men's senior team that was established the previous season. In 2014, after seven season's competing in the English Basketball League, the club were accepted into the country's newly created pre-eminent competition, the Women's British Basketball League. In view of the move and to gain more professional independence, the club cut its ties with Leeds Metropolitan University and rebranded as Leeds Force.

The club holds Sport England and England Basketball Club Mark accreditation as well as being an England Basketball Four Star club.

Home arena
Carnegie Sports Centre (2006–present)

Charitable Foundation
The club has also established a charitable arm - the Leeds Carnegie Basketball Foundation (LCBF Charity Number: 114096) - to maintain and develop relationships within the partnership networks to ensure growth and sustainability.  The LCBF delivers curricular and extra-curricular sessions, community development and special projects with such partners as the Youth Services Department, Extended Services and West Yorkshire Police.

References

External links
Official Leeds Force website
Leeds Force on Facebook
Leeds Force on Twitter

Women's basketball teams in England
Sport in Leeds
Women's British Basketball League teams
2006 establishments in England
Basketball teams established in 2006
Leeds Carnegie